Philip Wroughton (6 April 1846 – 7 June 1910) was an English landowner and Conservative politician who sat in the House of Commons from 1876 to 1895.

Wroughton was born at Ibstone, Buckinghamshire, the son of Philip Wroughton (1805-1862) of Woolley Park, Berkshire, and his wife Blanche Norris, daughter of John Norris of Hughenden House. His father was High Sheriff of Buckinghamshire in 1857, and left him the manors of Brightwalton, Chaddleworth, and Woolley. Wroughton was educated at Harrow School and Christ Church, Oxford. He was a Deputy Lieutenant and J.P. for Berkshire.

Wroughton was elected Member of Parliament (MP) for  Berkshire in  1876 and held the seat until it was divided under the Redistribution of Seats Act 1885. He was then elected MP for the division of Abingdon, and held the seat until 1895.

Death
Wroughton died at the age of 64 in Wantage in 1910.

Family
Wroughton married Evelyn Mary Neeld, daughter of Sir John Neeld, 1st Baronet on 4 February 1875. They lived at Woolley Park and had eight children, including Dorothy Florence Mary Wroughton, who married Rev. Herbert Lavallin Puxley of Llethr Llestri in Carmarthenshire, Mary St Quintin Wroughton (d. 9 December 1974), who married Ellis Robins (later Lord Robins) in 1912 and Philip Musgrave Neeld Wroughton who was killed in action on 19 April 1917 during the Sinai and Palestine Campaign.

The estate passed to his son Philip, and then to his oldest daughter Dorothy and her husband, Herbert Lavallin Puxley. They held the Woolley Park estate until their elder son Michael Lavallin Puxley was 21 years old. He then inherited the estate and changed his surname to Wroughton in order to do so.
He was the father of Philip Lavallin Wroughton, appointed Lord Lieutenant of Berkshire in 1995. Puxley/Wroughton was the uncle of James Puxley, appointed High Sheriff of Berkshire for 2000–2001.

References

External links 
 

1846 births
1910 deaths
Conservative Party (UK) MPs for English constituencies
Deputy Lieutenants of Berkshire
People from Wycombe District
People from Chaddleworth
UK MPs 1874–1880
UK MPs 1880–1885
UK MPs 1885–1886
UK MPs 1886–1892
UK MPs 1892–1895
English landowners
People educated at Harrow School
Alumni of Christ Church, Oxford
Members of the Parliament of the United Kingdom for Berkshire
19th-century British businesspeople